Deng Jiaxian, or Chia Hsien Teng (June 25, 1924 – July 29, 1986), was a Chinese nuclear physicist and academician of Chinese Academy of Sciences. He was a leading organizer and key contributor to the Chinese nuclear weapon programs.

Biography 
Deng was born in Huaining, Anhui, China, on June 25, 1924. After graduating with a major in physics from the National Southwestern Associated University where he was classmate with Nobel laureate Yang Chen-Ning, Deng taught at Peking University. He went to the United States in 1948 to study at Purdue University, and earned his PhD in physics in 1950. He returned to the newly founded People's Republic of China just nine days after graduation.

From 1958 on, Deng spent over 20 years working secretly with a team of young scientists including Qian Sanqiang under the Two Bombs, One Satellite program on the development of the nuclear and hydrogen bomb for China, culminating in success in 1964 and 1967. He died on July 29, 1986 in Beijing.

Deng is regarded as the "Father of China's Nuclear Program". In 1999, he was posthumously awarded the Two Bombs, One Satellite Meritorious Award for his contributions to Chinese military science, along with 22 other scientists.

See also 
 Abdul Qadeer Khan
 Bertrand Goldschmidt 
 Homi J. Bhabha 
 Igor Kurchatov
 J. Robert Oppenheimer
 William Penney, Baron Penney

References

External links
 Deng Jiaxian on New York Times

1924 births
1986 deaths
Chinese nuclear physicists
Chinese Communist Party politicians from Anhui
Educators from Anhui
Members of the 12th Central Committee of the Chinese Communist Party
Members of the Chinese Academy of Sciences
National Southwestern Associated University alumni
Academic staff of Peking University
People from Huaining County
People's Republic of China politicians from Anhui
Physicists from Anhui
Politicians from Anqing
Purdue University alumni